Explanatory journalism or explanatory reporting is a form of reporting that attempts to present ongoing news stories in a more accessible manner by providing greater context than would be presented in traditional news sources. The term is often associated with the explanatory news website Vox, but explanatory reporting (previously explanatory journalism) has also been a Pulitzer Prize category since 1988. Other examples include The Upshot by The New York Times, Bloomberg Quicktake, The Conversation, and FiveThirtyEight.

Relation to analytic journalism
Journalism professor Michael Schudson says explanatory journalism and analytic journalism are the same, because both attempt to "explain a complicated event or process in a comprehensible narrative" and require "intelligence and a kind of pedagogical flair, linking the capacity to understand a complex situation with a knack for transmitting that understanding to a broad public." Schudson says explanatory journalists "aid democracy."

See also

 Analytic journalism
Investigative journalism
 Narrative journalism
 Opinion journalism
 Pundit

References

External links
 How explanatory journalism informs and engages audiences, online course organized by the Knight Center for Journalism in the Americas
 Explanatory journalism: What it is and how to do it, The Fix Media

Types of journalism